Coleophora pachyderma is a moth of the family Coleophoridae.

References

pachyderma
Moths described in 1994